Rubus philyrophyllus is an uncommon Mexican species of brambles in the rose family. It has been found only in the States of Puebla and Oaxaca in Mexico.

Rubus philyrophyllus  is a perennial shrub with straight prickles and many hairs. Leaves are compound with 3 leaflets.

References

philyrophyllus
Flora of Oaxaca
Flora of Puebla
Plants described in 1853